Steven Jay Hatfill (born October 24, 1953) is an American physician, pathologist and biological weapons expert. He became the subject of extensive media coverage beginning in mid-2002, when he was a suspect in the 2001 anthrax attacks. His home was repeatedly raided by the FBI, his phone was tapped, and he was extensively surveilled for more than two years; he was also terminated from his job at Science Applications International Corporation (SAIC). At a news conference in August 2002, Hatfill denied that he had anything to do with the anthrax letters and said "irresponsible news media coverage based on government leaks" had "destroyed his reputation". He filed a lawsuit in 2003, accusing the FBI agents and Justice Department officials who led the criminal investigation of leaking information about him to the press in violation of the Privacy Act.

In 2008, the government settled Hatfill's lawsuit with a $4.6 million annuity totaling $5.8 million in payment. The government officially exonerated him of any involvement in the anthrax attacks, and the Justice Department identified another military scientist, Bruce Edwards Ivins, as the sole perpetrator of the anthrax attacks. Jeffrey A. Taylor, the U.S. Attorney for the District of Columbia, wrote in a letter to Hatfill's lawyer that "we have concluded, based on laboratory access records, witness accounts and other information, that Dr. Hatfill did not have access to the particular anthrax used in the attacks, and that he was not involved in the anthrax mailings."

In 2004, Hatfill filed lawsuits against several periodicals and journalists who had identified him as a figure warranting further investigation in the anthrax attacks. He sued the New York Times Company and New York Times columnist Nicholas Kristof for defamation, defamation per se, and intentional infliction of emotional distress in connection with five of Kristof's columns in 2002. The courts dismissed this suit, finding that Hatfill was a limited purpose public figure. In 2007, Hatfill settled a similar libel lawsuit against Vanity Fair and Reader's Digest for an undisclosed amount, after both magazines agreed to formally retract any implication that Hatfill was involved in the anthrax mailings.

In 2010, Hatfill was an independent researcher and an adjunct assistant professor of emergency medicine at the George Washington University Medical Center. He has criticized the response of health authorities to the Ebola virus epidemic in West Africa and suggested that it is possible that Ebola could be transmitted by aerosol, a position which other experts have criticized.

In 2020 he became a coronavirus advisor to the Trump White House, where he strongly promoted the use of hydroxychloroquine to treat the virus despite FDA objections to the drug. After the 2020 election he became part of Donald Trump's attempt to overturn the election results.

Early life
Hatfill was born in Saint Louis, Missouri, and graduated from Mattoon Senior High School, Mattoon, Illinois (1971), and Southwestern College in Winfield, Kansas (1975), where he studied biology.

Hatfill was enlisted as a private in the U.S. Army from 1975 to 1977. (In 1999, during an interview with a journalist, he claimed to have been a "captain in the U.S. Special Forces", but a subsequent investigation revealed that, according to the Army, he had never served with the Special Forces.) Following his Army discharge, Hatfill qualified and worked as a medical laboratory technician, but soon resolved to become a doctor. He worked as a medical missionary in Kapanga, Zaire under a mentor, Dr. Glenn Eschtruth, who was murdered there in 1977. A brief marriage, from 1976 to 1978, to Eschtruth's daughter, Caroline Rush Eschtruth, produced one daughter.

Medical education
In 1978, Hatfill settled in Rhodesia (now Zimbabwe) and entered the Godfrey Huggins Medical School at the University of Rhodesia in Salisbury (now Harare). (His claimed military associations during this period included assistance as a medic with the Selous Scouts and membership in the Rhodesian SAS, but according to one journalist the regimental association of the latter is "adamant Hatfill never belonged to the unit".) After failing in 1983, he graduated in 1984 with a M ChB degree and, in 1984 to 1985, completed a one-year internship at a small rural hospital in South Africa's North West Province. The South African government recruited him to be medical officer on a 14-month tour of duty, from 1986 to 1988, in Antarctica with the South African National Antarctic Expedition (SANAE). In 1988, he completed a master's degree in microbiology at the University of Cape Town. Two years later, he worked toward a second master's degree—in medical biochemistry and radiation biology—at the University of Stellenbosch, while employed as a medical technician in the university's clinical hematology lab. A three-year hematological pathology residency at Stellenbosch from 1991 to 1993 followed. Hatfill also conducted research toward a Ph.D. between 1992 and 1995—under the supervision of microbiology professor Ralph Kirby at Rhodes University—on the treatment of leukemia with thalidomide.

Hatfill submitted his Ph.D. thesis for examination to Rhodes University in January 1995, but it was failed in November. Hatfill later claimed to have completed a Ph.D. degree in "molecular cell biology" at Rhodes, as well as a post-doctoral fellowship (1994–95) at the University of Oxford in England and three master's degrees (in microbial genetics, medical biochemistry, and experimental pathology), respectively. Some of these credentials have been seriously questioned or disputed. During a later investigation, officials at Rhodes maintained that their institution had never awarded him a Ph.D. In 2007, Hatfill's lawyer Tom Connolly – in his lawsuit against former U.S. Attorney General John Ashcroft and the FBI – admitted that his client had “[p]uffed on his resume,” falsely claiming he had earned a PhD and had “[f]orged a diploma” for the PhD.

Back in the United States, another of Hatfill's post-doctoral appointments commenced at the National Institute of Child Health and Human Development (NICHD), one of the National Institutes of Health (NIH) in Bethesda, Maryland, in 1995. He then worked in 1997 to 1999 as a civilian researcher at the United States Army Medical Research Institute of Infectious Diseases (USAMRIID), the U.S. Department of Defense's medical research institute for biological warfare (BW) defense at Fort Detrick, Frederick, Maryland. There, he studied, under a National Research Council fellowship, new drug treatments for the Ebola virus and became an authority on BW defense.

Anthrax attacks
In January 1999 Hatfill transferred to a "consulting job" at Science Applications International Corporation (SAIC), which has a "sprawling campus" in nearby McLean, Virginia. The corporation did work for a multitude of federal agencies. Many projects were classified. Hatfill designed BW defense training curricula for government agencies.

By this time there had been a number of hoax anthrax mailings in the United States. Hatfill and his collaborator, SAIC vice president Joseph Soukup, commissioned William C. Patrick, retired head of the old US bioweapons program (who had also been a mentor of Hatfill) to write a report on the possibilities of terrorist anthrax mailing attacks. Barbara Hatch Rosenberg (director of the Federation of American Scientists' biochem weapons working group in 2002) said that the report was commissioned "under a CIA contract to SAIC".  But SAIC said Hatfill and Soukup had commissioned it there was no outside client.

The resulting report, dated February 1999, was subsequently seen by some as a "blueprint" for the 2001 anthrax attacks.  Amongst other things, it suggested the maximum amount of anthrax that could be put in an envelope without making a suspicious bulge.  The quantity in the envelope sent to Senator Patrick Leahy in October 2001 was .871 grams.  After the attacks, the report drew the attention of the media and others, and led to their investigation of Patrick and Hatfill.

Assertions by Rosenberg 
As soon as it became known, in October 2001, that the Ames strain of anthrax had been used in the attacks, Barbara Hatch Rosenberg and others began suggesting that the mailings might be the work of a "rogue CIA agent" and they provided the name of the "most likely" person to the FBI. On November 21, 2001, Rosenberg made similar statements to the Biological and Toxic Weapons convention in Geneva.  In December 2001, she published "A Compilation of Evidence and Comments on the Source of the Mailed Anthrax" via the web site of the Federation of American Scientists (FAS) suggesting the attacks were "perpetrated with the unwitting assistance of a sophisticated government program".

Rosenberg discussed the case with reporters from the New York Times.  On January 4, 2002, Nicholas Kristof of the New York Times published a column titled "Profile of a Killer" stating "I think I know who sent out the anthrax last fall."  For months, Rosenberg gave speeches and stated her beliefs to many reporters from around the world.  She posted "Analysis of the Anthrax Attacks" to the FAS web site on January 17, 2002.  On February 5, 2002, she published an article called "Is the FBI Dragging Its Feet?"  At the time, the FBI denied reports that investigators had identified a chief suspect, saying "There is no prime suspect in this case at this time."  The Washington Post reported that "FBI officials over the last week have flatly discounted Dr. Rosenberg's claims."

On June 13, 2002, Rosenberg posted "The Anthrax Case: What the FBI Knows" to the FAS site. Five days later, Rosenberg presented her theories to senate staffers working for Senators Daschle and Leahy.  On June 25, the FBI publicly searched Hatfill's apartment, turning him into a household name. "The FBI also pointed out that Hatfill had agreed to the search and is not considered a suspect." Both The American Prospect and Salon.com reported that  "Hatfill is not a suspect in the anthrax case, the FBI says."  On August 3, 2002, Rosenberg told the media that the FBI asked her if "a team of government scientists could be trying to frame Steven J. Hatfill."

Person of interest
In August 2002,  Attorney General John Ashcroft labeled Hatfill a "person of interest" in a press conference, although no charges were brought against him. Hatfill, who researched viruses, vehemently denied having any connection to the anthrax mailings and sued the FBI, the Justice Department, John Ashcroft, Alberto Gonzales, and others for violating his constitutional rights and the Privacy Act. On June 27, 2008, the Department of Justice announced it would settle Hatfill's case for $5.8 million.

Hatfill later went to work at Pennington Biomedical Research Center in Baton Rouge, Louisiana. In September 2001, SAIC was commissioned by the Pentagon to create a replica of a mobile WMD "laboratory", alleged to have been used by Saddam Hussein, then President of Iraq. The Pentagon said the trailer was to be used as a training aid for teams seeking weapons of mass destruction in Iraq.

His lawyer, Victor M. Glasberg, stated: "Steve's life has been devastated by a drumbeat of innuendo, implication and speculation. We have a frightening public attack on an individual who, guilty or not, should not be exposed to this type of public opprobrium based on speculation."

In an embarrassing incident, FBI agents trailing Hatfill in a motor vehicle ran over his foot when he attempted to approach them in May 2003. Police responding to the incident did not cite the driver, but issued Hatfill a citation for "walking to create a hazard". He and his attorneys fought the ticket, but a hearing officer upheld the ticket and ordered Hatfill to pay the requisite $5 fine.

FBI Director Robert Mueller changed leadership of the investigation in late 2006, and at that time another suspect, USAMRIID bacteriologist Bruce Ivins, became the main focus of the investigation.
Considerable questions were raised about the credibility of the case against Ivins, as well.

60 Minutes interview
Hatfill's lawyer, Tom Connolly, was featured in a CBS News 60 Minutes interview about the anthrax incidents on March 11, 2007.  In the interview Connolly revealed that Hatfill faked his Ph.D. degree: "It is true. It is true that he has puffed on his resume. Absolutely. Forged a diploma. Yes, that's true." He went on to state, "Listen, if puffing on your resume made you the anthrax killer, then half this town should be suspect."

The New York Times stated that Hatfill had obtained an anti-anthrax medicine (ciprofloxacin) immediately prior to the anthrax mailings. Connolly explained, "Before the attacks he had surgery. So yes, he's on Cipro. But the fuller truth is in fact he was on Cipro because a doctor gave it to him after sinus surgery." Hatfill had previously said the antibiotic was for a lingering sinus infection.  The omission in the Times''' article, of the reason why he had been taking Cipro, is one reason Hatfill sued the newspaper. The newspaper won a summary judgment ruling in early 2007, squelching the libel suit that had been filed by Steven Hatfill against it and columnist Nicholas Kristof.

Lawsuits
Hatfill v. John Ashcroft, et al.
On August 26, 2003, Hatfill filed a lawsuit against the Attorney General of the United States John Ashcroft, the United States Department of Justice, DOJ employees Timothy Beres and Daryl Darnell, the Federal Bureau of Investigation, FBI Supervisory Special Agent Van Harp and an unknown number of FBI agents.

On April 27, 2007, the U.S. District Court for the District of Columbia found that Hatfill had overstepped court orders allowing him to compel testimony from reporters whom he had already questioned, and had instead "served a new round of subpoenas" on organizations "that he failed to question during the discovery period."

During the first round of depositions, Hatfill subpoenaed six reporters: Michael Isikoff and Daniel Klaidman of Newsweek,  Brian Ross of ABC, Allan Lengel of The Washington Post, Jim Stewart of CBS, and Toni Locy of USA Today.

Hatfill then subpoenaed eight news organizations, including three that he didn't name before: the New York Times (Nicolas Kristof, David Johnson, William Broad, Kate Zernike, Judith Miller, Scott Shane, and Frank D. Roylance), The Baltimore Sun (Gretchen Parker and Curt Anderson), and the Associated Press. Subpoenas for Washington Post writers Marilyn W. Thompson, David Snyder, Guy Gugliotta, Tom Jackman, Dan Eggen and Carol D. Loenning, and for Mark Miller of Newsweek, were included.

The Justice Department responded to Hatfill's subpoenas, saying that they went too far. "The court should reject this attempt to expand discovery," prosecutors wrote. In a status conference on Friday 11 January 2008, U.S. District Judge Reggie B. Walton ordered the attorneys for the government and for Hatfill to seek mediation over the next two months. According to the Scheduling Order, the parties were in mediation from January 14 until May 14, 2008. The prospects of a mediated settlement notwithstanding, Walton said he expected that a trial on the lawsuit could begin in December. Afterward, Hatfill's attorney Mark A. Grannis said: "The court has set a schedule for bringing this case to trial this year, and we're very pleased at the prospect that Dr. Hatfill will finally have his day in court."

On March 7, 2008, Toni Locy of USA Today was ordered to personally pay contempt of court fines of up to $5,000 a day which begin the following Tuesday (i.e. 4 days hence), until she identifies her sources.

On June 27, 2008 Hatfill was exonerated by the government and a settlement was announced in which the Justice Department has agreed to pay $4.6 million (consisting of $2.825 million in cash and an annuity paying $150,000 a year for 20 years) to settle the lawsuit in which Hatfill claimed the Justice Department violated his privacy rights by speaking with reporters about the case.Anthrax Scientist Reported to Kill Self; Associated Press; 2008-08-01; accessed 2008-08-01

Hatfill v. The New York Times
In July 2004, Hatfill filed a lawsuit against The New York Times Company and Nicholas D. Kristof.

In a sealed motion on December 29, 2006, The New York Times argued that the classification restrictions imposed on the case were tantamount to an assertion of the state secrets privilege. Times attorneys cited the case law on state secrets to support their argument that the case should be dismissed.  The "state secrets" doctrine, they said, "precludes a case from proceeding to trial when national security precludes a party from obtaining evidence that is... necessary to support a valid defense. Dismissal is warranted in this case because the Times has been denied access to such evidence, specifically documents and testimony concerning the work done by plaintiff [Hatfill] on classified government projects relating to bioweapons, including anthrax."

A redacted copy of the December 29, 2006 New York Times Memorandum of Law in Support of Defendant's Motion for an Order Dismissing the Complaint Under the "State Secrets" Doctrine was obtained by Secrecy News.

Attorneys for Hatfill filed a sealed response on January 12, 2007 in opposition to the motion for dismissal on state secrets grounds. A redacted copy of their opposition has been made available by Secrecy News.

On January 12, 2007, a judge dismissed a lawsuit filed by Hatfill against The New York Times.

On January 30, 2007, Judge Hilton's order dismissing the Hatfill v. The New York Times was made public, along with a Memorandum Opinion explaining his ruling. Kenneth A. Richieri, Vice President and General Counsel of The New York Times described what he called a "very satisfying win" at the beginning of 2007 in the Eastern District of Virginia. The newspaper won a summary judgment ruling squelching a libel suit that had been filed by anthrax poisoning "person of interest" Steven Hatfill against it and columnist Nicholas Kristof.

The US Court of Appeals for the Fourth Circuit reversed the trial court, ruling that a jury should decide that issue. In March 2008, the Supreme Court refused to grant certiorari in the case, effectively leaving the appeals court decision in place.

The case was dismissed in a Summary Judgment on January 12, 2007.  The appeals were heard on March 21, 2008, and the dismissal was upheld by the appeals court on July 14, 2008.  The case was appealed to the U.S. Supreme Court and was rejected by the Supreme Court on Dec. 15, 2008.  The basis for the dismissal was that Dr. Hatfill was a "public figure", and he had not proved malice on the part of The New York Times. see: New York Times Co. v. Sullivan

Hatfill v. Foster
Donald Foster, an expert in forensic linguistics, advised the FBI during the investigation of the anthrax attacks. He later wrote an article for Vanity Fair about his investigation of Hatfill. In the October 2003 article Foster described how he had tried to match up Hatfill's travels with the postmarks on the anthrax letters, and analyzed old interviews and an unpublished novel by Hatfill about a bioterror attack on the United States. Foster wrote that "When I lined up Hatfill's known movements with the postmark locations of reported biothreats, those hoax anthrax attacks appeared to trail him like a vapor cloud".

Hatfill subsequently sued Donald Foster, Condé Nast Publications, Vassar College, and The Reader's Digest Association. The suit sought $10 million in damages, claiming defamation. The Reader's Digest published a condensed version of the article in December 2003.

The lawyers delayed bringing the Hatfill v. Foster lawsuit to court because "the parties are close to finalizing the settlement".

On February 27, 2007, The New York Sun reported that he settled without a trial.

Hatfill v. John Michie and Google
In 2010, Hatfill sued Google to persuade them to reveal the IP address behind the blog of one "Luigi Warren", which was hosted by Google's blogspot web-hosting service. According to Newsweek, "Luigi Warren" had "operated a lurid rumor mill about Hatfill for more than a decade – promoting, in particular, hearsay about the years he lived and worked in southern Africa during the throes of apartheid." Hatfill and his lawyers soon learned that the real Luigi Warren, a stem-cell researcher at Harvard Medical School (who had, in fact, been a prolific post-9/11 commentator on his own "woolly blog, The Hatfill Deception") was not the source of the recent diatribes in question. Rather, that source was someone impersonating Warren – one John Michie, a radiation oncologist at Stellenbosch University in South Africa, Hatfill's alma mater.  Michie agreed to an undisclosed settlement and Google was dismissed from the lawsuit.

Post-settlement life
2010s
Since the settlements of his legal cases, which included receiving $5.8 million (less legal costs) from the Justice Department (2008) and undisclosed sums from Condé Nast (2008) and the South African medical researcher (2010), Hatfill has pursued activities as an independent researcher. He was appointed an adjunct assistant professor of emergency medicine at the George Washington University Medical Center in 2010. In 2011, he added additional affiliations at GW in "Clinical Research and Leadership" and "Microbiology, Immunology, and Tropical Medicine". (His BA degree and one MS degree — but not his other previously claimed medical degrees — appear on the GW Faculty Directory.) He oversees construction of a "state-of-the-art boat" on which he intends to conduct his own scientific trials. He has allocated more than $1 million of his own money to construct a full-scale prototype of what he calls Beagle III. This craft, with a crew of military veterans and scientists, would ply the waters of "high-biodiversity areas" – the Amazon, or the great rivers of Borneo – seeking and studying rare plants and fungi as sources of new drugs.  A Newsweek interviewer has described ... ...Hatfill's unbuilt, twin-diesel-powered boat. Inside the vessel's aluminum hull, he envisioned a plexus of laboratories, with DNA microarrays and other "space-age zuzu" for analyzing the genetic compositions of plants. Bedrooms would be equipped with video-conferencing systems and DVD players, and the executive cabin was modeled after the president's quarters on Air Force One.... Hatfill had also thrown in a roof-mounted cosmic ray detector, which would switch on near the equator to capture data on "high-energy cosmic ray showers". An onboard chef from the ranks of Le Cordon Bleu would fuel a crew of scientists and trainees, and a 30-day supply of dehydrated food would hedge against disaster.
 
Hatfill owns a colonial-style brick home in Marion County, Florida as well as a property in the El Yunque rain forest, in Puerto Rico, where he has run a military-style Outward Bound-like program. Hatfill chairs the Asymmetrical Biodiversity Studies and Observation Group (ABSOG) in Malaysia, a not-for-profit trust he has established to support his drug discovery boat mission. Hatfill has also established Templar Associates II, a for-profit corporation in Puerto Rico as a revenue-generator and as an "environmental testing ground for new tactics, techniques, equipment, and procedures for ABSOG's designated mission as well as for the U.S. military".
 
Hatfill is also medical director of EFP Tactical Medical Group, a London-based company that provides integrated training, security and tactical medical support services to government agencies, private corporations, and NGOs worldwide. (EFP Tacmed has extensive Middle Eastern and African contracts; it operates a remote jungle-training facility to test new equipment in "high-biodiversity areas".) He is also a board member of Doctors for Disaster Preparedness, a politically conservative Arizona-based non-profit described by some journalists as a "political fringe group". He claims status as a fellow of the Explorers Club.
 
In 2014, Hatfill publicly criticized the response of U.S. public health authorities to the Ebola virus epidemic in West Africa and suggested that it is possible that Ebola could be transmitted by aerosol, an assertion which other experts have disputed; his views on this have been characterized as misrepresentations of the primary scientific literature by other experts.

In November 2019, Hatfill and two other authors self-published Three Seconds Until Midnight. The book examines current preparedness and unpreparedness for a devastating future influenza pandemic.

2020s
In 2020 during the COVID-19 pandemic, Hatfill was interviewed on several right-wing media outlets including Stephen Bannon’s War Room: Pandemic, The Epoch Times, and Sinclair Broadcast Group’s Full Measure with Sharyl Attkisson.  He opposed the U.S. response to the pandemic, particularly the exclusion of hydroxychloroquine for early treatment of COVID-19, making unproven claims that the low fatality rate experienced by some nations is the result of their early use of the drug.

In February 2020 Hatfill became an unpaid "volunteer" advisor to White House trade director Peter Navarro on the subject of the coronavirus pandemic. He interacted directly with senior officials at the Department of Health and Human Services, the Food and Drug Administration (FDA), and the White House, and he represented the administration in dealings with health care companies. Early in the pandemic he urged Navarro to quickly acquire tests and supplies, although he said such supplies should come only from U.S. sources. In an email to White House chief of staff Mark Meadows he said the president was being "grossly misadvised" by the White House Coronavirus Task Force, and recommended that the virus should be fought by widespread proactive administration of hydroxychloroquine, a malaria drug which the FDA had declared ineffective and potentially harmful to use for coronavirus. He repeatedly attacked Anthony Fauci and FDA commissioner Steven Hahn, at one point telling Fauci that he was "full of crap". Although the two were not removed from the task force as he urged, they were increasingly sidelined by Donald Trump.

Following the November 2020 election, Hatfill became an active participant in Trump's efforts to overturn the election results, flying to Arizona to help challenge its election results, writing proposals for "Trump's Legal Fight", and sharing anti-Biden rumors. According to House Majority Whip James E. Clyburn (D-S.C.) who chairs the House Select subcommittee investigating the COVID-19 crisis, “Dr. Hatfill has refused to provide documents and misleadingly downplayed his involvement in the pandemic response in communications with Select Subcommittee staff”.

References

Further reading

Burger, Marlene, "Murky past of a US bio-warrior", Mail & Guardian, (date disputed; URL retrieved September 11, 2006).
Willman, David, "The Mirage Man", Bantam Books, 2011
Bright, Martin, and Cooper, Simon, "Anthrax suspect lied to get jobs", The Observer, June 1, 2003 (URL retrieved September 11, 2006).
Bright, Martin, and Cooper, Simon, "Walter Mitty life of anthrax terror suspect", The Observer, June 1, 2003 (URL retrieved September 11, 2006).
Foster, Don, "The Message In The Anthrax", Vanity Fair, pp. 180–200, October 1, 2003 (URL retrieved September 11, 2006).
Freed, David, "The Wrong Man", The Atlantic, May, 2010 (URL retrieved October 11, 2011). 
http://www.columbia.edu/cu/news/vforum/02/anthrax_media/index.html Video of Columbia University School of Journalism Panel Discussion of Hatfill Investigation and Trial by Media
Tell, David '"The Hunting of Steven J. Hatfill"'. The Weekly Standard Sept 16th 2002 (URL retrieved November 11, 2006).
Weaver, Tony, [http://www.iol.co.za/news/south-africa/awb-sympathiser-quizzed-over-anthrax-killings-88943"AWB sympathiser quizzed over anthrax killings"]'', Daily News (South Africa), July 1, 2002 (URL retrieved March 25, 2017).
Peter McAleese, His autobiography "No Mean Soldier" contains an account of Hatfill taking a "short-cut" in Rhodesia.

1953 births
Living people
American pathologists
2001 anthrax attacks
Military personnel from St. Louis
Scientists from St. Louis
People related to biological warfare
Foreign volunteers in the Rhodesian Security Forces
American emigrants to Rhodesia
University of Zimbabwe alumni
Stellenbosch University alumni
Southwestern College (Kansas) alumni
American expatriates in South Africa